Brumoides is a genus of beetles of the family Coccinellidae. The genus was erected by Edward Albert Chapin in 1965.

Species
 Brumoides blumi (Nunenmacher, 1934)
 Brumoides histrio (Fall, 1901)
 Brumoides lineatus (Weise, 1885)
 Brumoides maculatus (Pope, 1954)
 Brumoides piae Ślipiński & Giorgi, 2006
 Brumoides septentrionis (Weise, 1885)
 Brumoides suturalis (Fabricius, 1798)

References
 "Brumoides Chapin, 1965". BioLib.cz. Retrieved March 13, 2018.

Coccinellidae genera
Coccinellidae